Wola Kożuszkowa (German, 1939–1945 Wulldorf)  is a village in the administrative district of Gmina Jeziora Wielkie, within Mogilno County, Kuyavian-Pomeranian Voivodeship, in north-central Poland.

The village has an approximate population of 400.

References

Villages in Mogilno County